Funar is a suco in East Timor.

Funar may also refer to:

 Gheorghe Funar, a nationalist Romanian politician, former mayor of Cluj-Napoca between 1992 and 2004

See also
 Funares, a village in Albania